{{Infobox Boxingmatch
|fight date    = April 12, 2014
|Fight Name    = Manny Pacquiao vs. Timothy Bradley II
|image         = 
|location      = MGM Grand Garden Arena, Paradise, Nevada, U.S.
|fighter1      = Manny Pacquiao
|nickname1     = Pac-Man
|record1       = 55–5–2 (38 KO)
|hometown1     = General Santos, Philippines
|height1       = 5 ft 6 in
|style1       = Southpaw
|weight1       = 145 lbs
|recognition1  = WBO International welterweight champion[[The Ring (magazine)|The Ring]] No. 7 ranked pound-for-pound fighter8-division world champion
|fighter2      = Timothy Bradley
|nickname2     = Desert Storm
|record2       = 31–0–0–1 (12 KO)
|hometown2     = Palm Springs, California, U.S.
|height2       = 5 ft 6 in
|weight2       = 145+1/2 lbs
|style2 = Orthodox
|recognition2  = WBO welterweight champion The Ring No. 3 ranked pound-for-pound fighter2-division world champion
|titles        = WBO welterweight title
|result        =  Pacquiao wins via 12-round unanimous decision (116-112, 116-112, 118-110)
}}
Manny Pacquiao vs. Timothy Bradley II, was a boxing welterweight championship fight for the WBO welterweight championship. The bout was held on April 12, 2014, at the MGM Grand Garden Arena in Paradise, Nevada. Pacquiao won by unanimous decision and took the WBO welterweight title, ending Bradley's undefeated streak.

National anthem singers

 (The Star-Spangled Banner): Ashanti
 (Lupang Hinirang): Jessica Sanchez

Fight card

Main bouts (HBO PPV)
WBO welterweight bout:  Manny Pacquiao vs.  Timothy Bradley (c)
Pacquiao won by unanimous decision.
NABO lightweight bout:  Raymundo Beltrán VS.  Arash Usmanee
Beltrán won by unanimous decision.
WBA/IBO light welterweight bout:  Khabib Allakhverdiev (c) vs.  Jessie Vargas
Vargas won by unanimous decision.
WBA super featherweight bout:  Bryan Vázquez (c) vs.  Jose Félix Jr.
Vázquez won by unanimous decision.

Preliminary bouts (TopRank.tv)

Light heavyweight bout:  Oleksandr Hvozdyk vs.  Mike Montoya
Hvozdyk won by TKO.
Featherweight bout:  Óscar Valdez vs.  Adrian Perez
Valdez won by TKO.
Super middleweight bout:  Esquiva Falcão vs.  Publio Pena
Falcao won by unanimous decision.
Light heavyweight bout:  Sean Monaghan vs.  Joe McCreedy
Monaghan won by TKO.

Broadcasting
In the United States, the fight was broadcast on pay-per-view through HBO Boxing using Top Rank graphics and online at TopRank.tv. The fights were commentated by Jim Lampley, Max Kellerman and Mario Lopez as special guest commentator.

Unlike in the first fight drawing 890,000 PPV buys, the second fight drew around 800,000 PPV buys based on ESPN's report. Other sources would estimate between 775,000 and 800,000 PPV buys.

International broadcasting

The broadcasts for viewers outside the United States were under the Top Rank banner and commentated by the HBO Boxing'' crew for the English broadcast.

External links

References

Bradley
2014 in boxing
Boxing in Las Vegas
2014 in sports in Nevada
Boxing on HBO
April 2014 sports events in the United States
MGM Grand Garden Arena